Christi-Adrian Sudu (born 29 May 1968) is a Canadian luger. He competed in the men's singles and doubles events at the 1992 Winter Olympics.

References

1968 births
Living people
Canadian male lugers
Olympic lugers of Canada
Lugers at the 1992 Winter Olympics
People from Fălticeni